The German National Tourist Board (abbreviation: GNTB, DZT) is a national marketing organisation and has worked with the Federal Government of Germany to promote tourism in and to Germany. It represents Germany throughout the world as a destination for holidays, business travel and visits to friends and family.

The GNTB is an eingetragener Verein which was founded in 1948. The head office is situated in Frankfurt am Main, Germany. The marketing organisation is mainly financed by the German National Ministry of Economy & Technology.

Since 1999, the German National Tourist Board has also been responsible for the marketing of domestic tourism from one region to another. Its strategic goal is the responsible marketing of inter-regional Vacation Themes in Germany.

The GNTB works in close cooperation and economic partnership with all levels of the tourism industry in Germany.

Offices / agencies
Marketing is split into six regional management areas:
 North West Europe
 South West Europe
 North East Europe
 South East Europe 
 America/Israel
 Asia/Australia

each with its own foreign representative offices and sales and marketing agencies. Countries without their own representation are covered by the appropriate regional management team.

The GNTB is present around the world with 31 foreign representative offices and sales agencies.  Apart from the GNTB's 12 own representative offices, the sales network abroad also encompasses marketing agencies with partners such as Deutsche Lufthansa AG and the Federation of German Chambers of Industry and Commerce (DIHK).

Marketing themes
Rigorous analysis and assessment of the markets form the basis of the GNTB's sales and marketing activities. In line with the international culture and health mega-trends, the GNTB developed its two major product lines: City Tours/Events and Hearth & Fitness Holidays, which it uses to derive key campaigns, long-term product segments and basic information and to devise themes for its international marketing activities.

 Annual Theme for 2017: Luther 2017
 Annual Theme for 2018: Culinary Germany
 Annual Theme for 2019: 100 years of Bauhaus
 Annual Theme for 2020: 250th anniversary of the birth of Beethoven

Publicity
Wilkommen in Deutschland; Weltausstellung EXPO 2000 Hannover / Welcome to Germany; World Exhibition EXPO 2000 Hannover. PAL videotape, 15 min.

References

External links
Website for englishspeaking Germany Travelers from all over the world
Website for Germany Travelers from the UK
Website for Germany Travelers form Ireland
Website for Germany Travelers from the USA/Canada
Picture database of the GNTB

Non-profit organisations based in Hesse
Organizations established in 1948
Tourism in Germany
Tourism agencies